Ploulec'h is a commune in the Côtes-d'Armor department of Brittany in northwestern France.

Population
Inhabitants of Ploulec'h are called ploulec'hois or ploulec'hiens in French.

Breton language
The municipality launched a linguistic plan through Ya d'ar brezhoneg on October 19, 2006.

International relations
Ploulec'h is twinned with:
  St Erth, Cornwall, UK

See also
Communes of the Côtes-d'Armor department

References

External links

Official website 

Communes of Côtes-d'Armor
Osismii